Marta Catellani is an Italian chemist known for her discovery of the eponymous Catellani reaction in 1997. She was elected to the European Academy of Sciences in 2016. Catellani earned her Ph.D. in chemistry in 1971 from the University of Parma, where, as of 2019, she is a professor and chairs the Department of Organic Chemistry.

Catellani completed her postdoctoral education at the University of Chicago. She has served as a visiting professor at Moscow State University (1992), Beijing Institute of Technology (2004), and University of Xi'an (2004). She was awarded a fellowship at the Japan Society for the Promotion of Science in 2012.

Her research focuses on palladium as a catalyst for multistep organic reactions.

The Catellani Reaction 
In chemistry there is a practice known as synthesis. This process is used to form complex chemical compounds from simpler ones. These complex compounds are desirable for their ranging abilities and properties. In order to produce the complex compounds, the simpler ones must “cooperate” in a specific way. This can be very difficult and requires patience, because of the time required to make the bonds so their uses and properties can be tested. There was a need for optimization of this process in order to speed up the development and testing of new compounds. Catellani and her team in 1997 found such a method to optimize this process. Catellani discovered a chain reaction process that simplified and increased yield for desirable complex compounds. One bond the Catellani Reaction is heavily used to create is Carbon-Carbon bonds. These bonds are desirable for their stability and strength. These qualities make the bonds very useful in the makeup of more complex compounds.

Since its discovery, the Catellani Reaction has opened the door to other discoveries or improvements in chemistry. Specifically in the world of pharmaceuticals, the Catellani Reaction has been a useful tool for synthesizing drugs in a more efficient way to aid in their development. Lenoxipen is an example of one of the complex compounds now much easier to achieve with the discovery of Catellani Reactions. This compound belongs to a group of compounds known as Lignans that are useful for relieving pain and may provide benefits to cancer patients. These examples of the uses for Catellani Reactions show the vast and indirect benefits to its discovery. To chemists, the Catellani Reaction is a tool that acts to optimize the process for making new compounds. These new compounds are pivotal for advancing what is possible through chemistry. As new scientists study and try to build upon the Catellani Reaction, it is important to remember who provided the first understanding as it would open up a new world of opportunity.

References 

Living people
Italian chemists
Italian women chemists
Italian women scientists
Members of the European Academy of Sciences and Arts
Academic staff of the University of Parma
Organic chemists
Year of birth missing (living people)